Phi Kappa was a social fraternity founded on  by a group of Catholic students at Brown University who were refused entrance to other fraternities because of their faith. On  April 29, 1959, Phi Kappa merged with a similar fraternity Theta Kappa Phi to form Phi Kappa Theta.

History
Phi Kappa's origin came as a local society at Brown University called Phi Kappa Sigma, meaning Fraternity of Catholic Students.  The Founders were:

The Founders did not have in mind the establishment of a full-fledged fraternity, but merely sought to establish a club for Catholic students. However, they soon realized the existence of a much older society with the same name, so in 1900 the name was changed to Phi Kappa. From the beginning the organization emphasized loyalty to alma mater and remained a home for Catholic students who were otherwise unable to join other fraternities.

Expansion was sought out at large schools, and not specifically Catholic institutions. Its Beta chapter was placed at the University of Illinois in 1912 with the adoption of the local Loyola Club. This was soon followed by Gamma chapter at Penn State in 1913.  Many of its chapters came from absorption of earlier local groups or Catholic clubs.

Phi Kappa joined the NIC in 1916.

At the time of the merger it was found that, despite the size of both organizations, there were only five schools where both fraternities existed:  Illinois, Penn State, Ohio State, Missouri and Wisconsin.  32 chapters were active at the time of the merger.

Symbols and traditions
The Fraternity's original magazine was first published in 1916.  It was called the Yippa-Yappa, after the nickname of the brotherhood during its early days at Brown.

The badge was square, situated in diamond fashion (called a quatrefoil), with amethysts at each corner.  The sides were finished with pearls.  The Greek letter , etched, was in the center, superimposed by the Greek letter , in plain (Roman) finish.

The colors were Purple, White, and Gold.

The Fraternity flower was the "Ophelia Rose".

Chapters
The chapters of Phi Kappa in 1959.  Active chapters at the time of the merger noted in bold, inactive chapters at the merger noted in italics. Information from Baird's 20th ed., unless otherwise noted.

References

Defunct former members of the North American Interfraternity Conference
Student organizations established in 1889
1889 establishments in Rhode Island